Quercus rysophylla, the loquat leaf oak, is a Mexican species of oak in the red oak section (Quercus section Lobatae). It is native to the Sierra Madre Oriental in the States of Tamaulipas, Nuevo León, San Luis Potosí, Veracruz, and Hidalgo in northeastern Mexico.

Description
It has smooth pale gray bark, which ages and becomes rough, deeply cracked and dark gray. It has acorns that are biennial, ripening the year after flowering.

Habitat
It is normally found growing in humid canyons and on north facing slopes, in cloud forests and oak or oak–pine forests. It grows on limestone and igneous substrates. It is normally found from  meters elevation.

The largest known population is in Cumbres de Monterrey National Park. It is also present in Sierra Gorda Biosphere Reserve.

Taxonomy
It was originally published and described by Charles Alfred Weatherby in 1910.

When Weatherby published his new tree, he made an error, he spelled 'rysophylla', the specific epithet refers to the Greek term ῥυσός (rhysos) meaning wrinkled and φύλλον (phyllon) for leaf. He should have used the correct spelling rhysophylla. Some botanists and publications change the epithet to rhysophylla. Although, the Melbourne Code, states it should be uncorrected, therefore the  original  spelling, rysophylla, is deemed correct. Other incorrect spellings 'risophylla', 'rhizophylla' and 'rizophylla' can be found.

It gained the common name 'Loquat oak' or 'loquat-leaf oak', from the superficial resemblance of the leaves in shape and texture to those of the loquat (Eriobotrya japonica).

References

External links

photo of herbarium specimen collected in Nuevo León in 1993

rysophylla
Endemic oaks of Mexico
Trees of Tamaulipas
Trees of Nuevo León
Trees of San Luis Potosí
Trees of Veracruz
Trees of Hidalgo (state)
Flora of the Sierra Madre Oriental
Plants described in 1910
Taxonomy articles created by Polbot
Cloud forest flora of Mexico